McClatchey Broadcasting is a privately owned company based in Raleigh, North Carolina, United States, that owns radio stations in North Carolina. The company is owned by Bill McClatchey. He is the son-in-law of Don Curtis, who owns the Curtis Media Group, which owns a number of radio stations in the Triangle area.

In Curtis Media Group's home market, it owns WQDR-FM, rock WBBB, oldies station WPCM, and the Triangle Traffic Network in Raleigh.  The station also owns WYMY in the Greensboro market.

References

External links
 official website

Radio broadcasting companies of the United States
Companies based in Raleigh, North Carolina